Huyler is a surname. Notable people with the surname include:

 Frank Huyler (born 1964), American emergency physician, poet and author
 John Huyler (1808–1870), American politician
 Stafford Huyler, author of the webcomic NetBoy

See also
 Hayler